This was the third edition of the Neox Fan Awards, created in Spain by Atresmedia with the sponsorship of The Coca-Cola Company's Fanta, for teenage audiences to honor the best of the year in television, films, music and sports. The show featured live musical performances by Abraham Mateo, Lucía Gil, Sweet California and Auryn.

Presenters

 Frank Blanco
 María Castro
 Javier Gutiérrez
 Raúl Arévalo
 Ruth Lorenzo
 Xuso Jones
 Raúl Fernández
 Patrick Criado
 Nerea Camacho
 Arantxa Martí
 Sandra Martín
 Arturo Valls
 Manel Fuentes
 Abraham Mateo
 Lucía Gil
 Santiago Segura
 Rush Smith
 JPelirrojo
 RoEnLaRed
 Chusita Fashion Fever
 Curricé

Awards

Film

Music

Television

Neox awards

References

2014 television awards
2014 in Spanish television